Royal Malaysian Navy Museum is a museum which exhibits items used by the Royal Malaysian Navy in Malacca City, Malacca, Malaysia. Exhibits included photos of admirals, medals of honor, as well as information about the various ranks in the naval command, evolution of naval uniforms, naval weapons, communication equipment, navigation symbols and training programs.

The museum was formerly located at Royal Malaysian Naval Base in Lumut, Perak. It was then relocated to Malacca to take the advantage of the larger number of tourists, both local and foreign visitors. The new location of the naval museum was opened to the public on 28 October 1995.

See also
 List of museums in Malaysia
 List of tourist attractions in Malacca

References

1995 establishments in Malaysia
Buildings and structures in Malacca City
Museums established in 1995
Museums in Malacca
Naval museums